Alessandro Favalli (born 15 November 1992) is an Italian footballer who plays as a defender for  club Siena.

Club career
Favalli started his professional career at Cremonese. He was the member of Allievi U17 team in the 2008–09 season. Favalli made his debut during the 2010–11 Lega Pro Prima Divisione.

On 18 July 2012, he was exchanged with Milan Đurić, which Favalli joined Cesena in temporary deal and Djuric to Cremonese also in a temporary deal.

He had limited chance to play and suffered from injury.

On 13 July 2013, Favalli joined Parma in co-ownership deal;, as a direct cashless swap with Andrea Brighenti. Both 50% registration rights of the players were valued for €250,000. He left for Slovenian club ND Gorica on 1 August, which the paperwork finalized on 7 August.

On 20 June 2014, the co-ownership deal was renewed, as well as Favalli would return to Cremonese for 2014–15 Lega Pro.

On 18 August 2015,  the player signed for Calcio Padova in Lega Pro.

On 10 January 2020, he signed a 1.5-year contract with Serie C club Reggiana.

On 5 October 2020 he moved to Perugia.

On 16 August 2021 he joined Siena.

International career
Favalli played two matches in the 2011–12 Four Nations Tournament and two friendlies for Italy national under-20 football team.

Personal life
On 6 March 2020, Favalli tested positive for COVID-19, becoming the second confirmed case in Italian football.

References

External links
 FIGC 
 Football.it Profile 
 

1992 births
Living people
Sportspeople from Cremona
Footballers from Lombardy
Italian footballers
Association football fullbacks
Serie B players
Serie C players
U.S. Cremonese players
A.C. Cesena players
Parma Calcio 1913 players
Calcio Padova players
Ternana Calcio players
U.S. Catanzaro 1929 players
A.C. Reggiana 1919 players
A.C. Perugia Calcio players
A.C.N. Siena 1904 players
Slovenian PrvaLiga players
ND Gorica players
Italian expatriate footballers
Italian expatriate sportspeople in Slovenia
Expatriate footballers in Slovenia
Italy youth international footballers